Tropidophorus assamensis, sometimes known as the north-eastern water skink,  is a species of skink. It is found only in Northeast India (Mizoram, Assam) and Bangladesh. It might occur in Bhutan. Individuals have been collected on or near (dry) stream beds. It is viviparous.

References

assamensis
Reptiles of Bangladesh
Reptiles of India
Taxa named by Nelson Annandale
Reptiles described in 1912